Mateusz Wdowiak (born 28 August 1996) is a Polish professional footballer who plays as a winger for Ekstraklasa club Raków Częstochowa.

Career

Cracovia
Wdowiak started his career in the Cracovia youth system and made his senior debut in 2015. On 20 March 2016, he scored his first goal for the senior team in the 48th minute in a 2–2 draw with Pogoń Szczecin.

Sandecja (loan)
In January 2017, Wdowiak was loaned out to Sandecja for the remainder of the season. He helped his side to the I Liga championship that season.

Career statistics

Club

Honours

Club
Sandecja
I liga: 2016–17

Cracovia
Polish Cup: 2019–20

Raków Częstochowa
Polish Cup: 2020–21, 2021–22
Polish Super Cup: 2021, 2022

References

External links
 
 

Living people
1996 births
Association football midfielders
Polish footballers
MKS Cracovia (football) players
Sandecja Nowy Sącz players
Raków Częstochowa players
Ekstraklasa players
I liga players
Footballers from Kraków
Poland youth international footballers
Poland under-21 international footballers